Sex, Drugs & Rock 'n' Roll is a live album by American heavy metal band the Mentors. Tracks 1–9 were recorded in Seattle in 1977.

Track listing

Personnel
 El Duce – drums, lead vocals
 Sickie Wifebeater – guitar
 Zippy – bass
 Dr. Heathen Scum – bass (tracks 1–9)
 Sneaky Spermshooter – bass on some parts

References

1989 albums
Mentors (band) albums